Marisel Ramírez (born 12 April 1970) is a Cuban table tennis player. She competed at the 1992 Summer Olympics and the 2000 Summer Olympics.

References

External links
 

1970 births
Living people
Cuban female table tennis players
Olympic table tennis players of Cuba
Table tennis players at the 1992 Summer Olympics
Table tennis players at the 2000 Summer Olympics
People from Ciego de Ávila
Table tennis players at the 1987 Pan American Games
Table tennis players at the 1995 Pan American Games
Medalists at the 1987 Pan American Games
Medalists at the 1995 Pan American Games
Pan American Games medalists in table tennis
Pan American Games gold medalists for Cuba
Pan American Games bronze medalists for Cuba
20th-century Cuban women